"Southside" is the debut single from American R&B singer Lloyd and features Ashanti. It was written by T. Hale, W. Morris, Tab
and by producer Jimi Kendrix for his debut studio album, Southside (2004). It peaked at number 13 on the U.S. Billboard Hot R&B Songs chart, and peaked at number 24 on the Billboard Hot 100. The remix featured rapper Scarface and Ashanti. The remix was released as the third and final single from the album.

Music video 
The video was released in June 2004. The standard version was filmed in a narrative fashion, with Irv Gotti playing Lloyd's fancy-car-driving father figure and Ashanti as his love interest whom he courts cellularly. The theme of the video is based on the movie A Bronx Tale. Rapper Ja Rule also makes an appearance in the video.

The remix version intercuts a street scene, with a shirtless Lloyd, a slightly gangsta-looking Ashanti, and a gruff-looking Scarface. It was located outside of a barber shop. It features clips from the original version also.

"Southside" also peaked at number one on BET's 106 & Park. Lloyd and Ashanti performed the song together on its third straight day at number one.

Chart position

Weekly charts

Year-end charts

Release history

References

2004 debut singles
Lloyd (singer) songs
Ashanti (singer) songs
2004 songs
Def Jam Recordings singles
Male–female vocal duets